() is an historical museum situated in Hanover, the capital of Lower Saxony, Germany. The museum was founded in 1903 as the Homeland Museum of the City of Hanover. Its collections are related to the history of the city, the history of the governing House of Welf, and of the state of Lower Saxony.

History 

Destroyed in 1943 during the aerial bombings of World War II, provisional reconstruction began in 1950, adopting the temporary name of Lower Saxon Homeland Museum. In 1966 the museum opened with its present name in a new building designed by the architect Dieter Oesterlen. The Association of the Friends of the Historical Museum supports the work of the museum both materially and non-materially.

In 2017, the museum's permanent exhibition, conceived in 1993, was redesigned. In 2020 the museum closed  for renovation work.

Location 

Even if the derivation of the city's name "Hanovere" or "Honovere" from the "high bank" should not be correct according to the latest scientific findings, the museum has a unique location in the area of the city's origin.

The Beginenturm integrated into the museum is the last completely preserved tower of the medieval . The museum building also incorporates a high stone wall of the ducal , built between 1643 and 1649. The wall facing the Hohes Ufer is a section of the city wall. In 2013, when significant medieval finds were discovered in the area during construction work on a neighbouring plot, it led to a three-months archaeological investigation. Opposite of the museum is the historic old town of Hanover which was completely destroyed in World War II, with  featuring numerous half-timbered houses reconstructed in the 1960s, as well as the restored  on Holzmarkt.

Building 

The museum building was constructed as a new building from 1964 to 1967 according to the plans of the architect Dieter Oesterlen. The Beginenturm and the rest of the ducal arsenal were included on the site of a block of flats in the old town development destroyed in the war. The museum has a polygonal ground plan around a pentagonal inner courtyard. The striking façade has three storeys with alternating broad sandstone surfaces and narrow bands of windows and a staggered view from the northern Burgstrasse. In 1991 it was rebuilt and in 2002 the individual departments were redesigned. This concerned the department of regional history on the ground floor and a part of the city history on the first floor.

The text of the illuminated quotation by Gottfried Wilhelm Leibniz on the Leibnizufer – a light installation by the American conceptual artist Joseph Kosuth – reads:

Collections

Departments 
The museum is divided in four departments:
 Vom Fürstentum zum Königreich (From principality to kingdom), showing the development from the Principality of Calenberg around 1600 to the end of the Kingdom of Hanover in 1866
 Vom Marktflecken zur Messestadt (From market village to trade fair city), showing how Hanover developed within 750 years from a settlement to den hogen overen (on the high banks) to a city
 Leben auf dem Lande (Life in the country), showing how the rural population of Lower Saxony lived from the 17th to the 20th centuries
 Museum Schloss Herrenhausen (Museum Herrenhausen Palace), located at Schloss Herrenhausen and opened in May 2013 as a new department

Photo archives 
The museum has one of the largest photo archives in Germany of around one million historical photographs for consultation and acquisition of reproductions. According to photo heritage, the museum has a stock of more than five million photos.

Decorations and orders 
The politician and banker  donated the so-called Finkam Collection of Orders and decorations to the Vaterländisches Museum.

Vehicles 

People 

From 1928 to 1945,  was director of the Vaterländisches Museum in Hanover.

Further reading 
 Historisches Museum Hannover. In Dieter Oesterlen: Bauten und Texte 1946–1991. Tübingen: Wasmuth 1992, . .
 Waldemar R. Röhrbein: Historisches Museum am Hohen Ufer 1903 – 1978. In , Neue Folge 32 (1978), 
 Franz Rudolf Zankl: Ausstellung der Gildealtertümer im Vaterländischen Museum. Fotografie um 1910. In , Blatt K 12
 Helmuth Plath: Stadtgeschichtliche Abteilung. (Abteilungskataloge des Historischen Museums am Hohen Ufer, Hannover. 1). Hanover 1970.
 Mit Geschichte in die Zukunft, Festschrift zum 25-jährigen Bestehen der Freunde des Historischen Museums, Hannover 2005
 Helmut Knocke, Hugo Thielen: Pferdestraße 6. In , 
 Thomas Schwark, Waldemar R. Röhrbein: Historisches Museum In Klaus Mlynek, Waldemar R. Röhrbein (ed.) among others: . Von den Anfängen bis in die Gegenwart. Schlütersche, Hanover 2009, .

References

External links 

 
 
 Stadttafel Historisches Museum

Museums in Hanover
Local museums in Germany
Automobile museums in Germany
1908 establishments in Germany
Museums established in 1903